Pulling may refer to: 

 Pulling (film), a 2004 American film featuring Amanda Loncar
 Pulling (TV series), a 2000s British TV series
 Truck pulling and tractor pulling, a motor sport
 Pulling (American football), an offensive maneuver in American football
 Pulling (cooking), pouring milk between two cups to alter its consistency, as when making teh tarik
 Pulling station, a railway station on the Munich S-Bahn
 Pulling is a word for rowing, in some contexts referring to a specific type of rowing

People
 Pulling (surname)

See also
 Pull (disambiguation)